Hamza Abu al-Haija (also "Hamzi"; 22 March 2014) was an Al-Qassam Brigades commander killed by Israel Defense Forces.

Biography
In , Hamza Abu al-Haija was born the youngest son of Asmaa and sheikh Jamal Abu al-Haija.  By June 2003, both of al-Haija's parents and three brothers were in Israeli jail.

As an adult, al-Haija was a commander in the Izz ad-Din al-Qassam Brigades, wanted by Israeli authorities for "shooting and bombing attacks as well as planning future attacks".  On 18 December, al-Haija escaped an Israel Defense Forces (IDF) raid on his home in the Jenin, West Bank refugee camp, though his friend Nafaa Saidi was killed by soldiers.  It was around 3:00A.M. on 22 March 2014 (UTC+02:00) when the IDF caught up with him in-camp, and after the Hamas leader exhausted his ammunition, the 22-year-old was killed by the IDF.

References

1990s births
2014 deaths
deaths by firearm in the West Bank
Hamas military members
people killed by Israeli security forces